Silvia Piccagnoni (born 27 May 1993) is an Italian ski mountaineer.

Piccagnoni was born in Sondalo. After notable results in youth classes, she participated in the women's senior relay team (together with Martina Valmassoi and Corinne Clos) at the 2011 World Championship of Ski Mountaineering, which finished fifth.

Piccagnoni is member of the Sci Club Alta Valtellina.

External links 
 Silvia Piccagnoni, skimountaineering.org

References 

1993 births
Living people
Italian female ski mountaineers
People from Sondalo
Sportspeople from the Province of Sondrio